Lee Da-in (born Im Joo-hee []; November 5, 1992) is a South Korean actress.

Personal life
Lee is the daughter of actress Kyeon Mi-ri. Her father, Lee Hong-heon, adopted her and her sister, Lee Yu-bi, after marrying Kyeon in 1998. Lee changed her real name, Lee Joo-hee to Lee Ra-yoon ahead of her marriage. But she did not change her stage name.

Relationship and marriage 
Lee has been in a relationship with actor Lee Seung-gi since late 2020. On February 7, 2023, Lee Seung-gi announced their engagement in letters posted on his social media accounts, and will have a wedding on April 7.

Filmography

Film

Television series

Awards and nominations

References

External links
 

South Korean television actresses
South Korean film actresses
1992 births
Living people
21st-century South Korean actresses
Hanyang University alumni
Actresses from Seoul